Jenma Natchathram is a 1991 Indian Tamil-language supernatural horror film directed and co-written by Thakkali Srinivasan. A remake of the American film The Omen (1976), it stars newcomers Pramod, G. Anandharam, Sindhuja and Baby Vichithra. The film was released on 30 August 1991.

Plot

Cast 
 Pramod as Antony
 G. Anandharam as Swaminathan
 Sindhuja as Jennifer
 Baby Vichithra as Xavier
 Vivek as David
 Prasanna as Doctor Sampath
 Indira Devi as Mrs. Elizabeth
 V. Gopalakrishnan as Doctor Philips
 Loose Mohan as John
 Sundari as Xavier's nanny
 Nassar as Father Murphy

Production 
Jenma Natchathram is an unofficial remake of the American film The Omen (1976). It is the acting debut of Pramod, G. Anandharam, Sindhuja and Baby Vichithra.

Release and reception 
Jenma Natchathram was released on 30 August 1991. C. R. K. of Kalki gave a positive review, praising the camera work, absence of songs, and the combination of Sindhuja and Vichithra, but criticised Vivek's comedy.

References

External links 
 

1990s supernatural horror films
1990s Tamil-language films
Indian remakes of American films
Indian supernatural horror films